Haloperidol, sold under the brand name Haldol among others, is a typical antipsychotic medication. Haloperidol is used in the treatment of schizophrenia, tics in Tourette syndrome, mania in bipolar disorder, delirium, agitation, acute psychosis, and hallucinations from alcohol withdrawal. It may be used by mouth or injection into a muscle or a vein. Haloperidol typically works within 30 to 60 minutes. A long-acting formulation may be used as an injection every four weeks by people with schizophrenia or related illnesses, who either forget or refuse to take the medication by mouth.

Haloperidol may result in a movement disorder known as tardive dyskinesia which may be permanent. Neuroleptic malignant syndrome and QT interval prolongation may occur. In older people with psychosis due to dementia it results in an increased risk of death. When taken during pregnancy it may result in problems in the infant. It should not be used by people with Parkinson's disease.

Haloperidol was discovered in 1958 by Paul Janssen, prepared as part of a structure-activity relationship investigation into analogs of pethidine (meperidine). It is on the World Health Organization's List of Essential Medicines. It is the most commonly used typical antipsychotic. In 2020, it was the 303rd most commonly prescribed medication in the United States, with more than 1million prescriptions.

Physicochemical properties 
Haloperidol is a crystalline material with a melting temperature of 150 °C. This drug has very very low solubility in water (1.4 mg/100 mL), but it is soluble in chloroform, benzene, methanol, and acetone. It is also soluble in 0.1 M hydrochloric acid (3 mg/mL) with heating.

Medical uses 

Haloperidol is used in the control of the symptoms of:
 Acute psychosis, such as drug-induced psychosis caused by, amphetamines, ketamine, and phencyclidine, and psychosis associated with high fever or metabolic disease. Some evidence, however, has found haloperidol to worsen psychosis due to psilocybin.
 Adjunctive treatment of alcohol and opioid withdrawal
 Agitation and confusion associated with cerebral sclerosis
 Alcohol-induced psychosis
 Hallucinations in alcohol withdrawal
 Hyperactive delirium (to control the agitation component of delirium)
 Hyperactivity, aggression
 Otherwise uncontrollable, severe behavioral disorders in children and adolescents
 Schizophrenia
 Therapeutic trial in personality disorders, such as borderline personality disorder
 Treatment of intractable hiccups
 Treatment of neurological disorders, including tic disorders such as Tourette syndrome, and chorea
 Treatment of severe nausea and emesis in postoperative and palliative care, especially for palliating adverse effects of radiation therapy and chemotherapy in oncology. Also used as a first line antiemetic for acute Cannabis Hyperemesis Syndrome.

Haloperidol was considered indispensable for treating psychiatric emergency situations, although the newer atypical drugs have gained a greater role in a number of situations as outlined in a series of consensus reviews published between 2001 and 2005.

In a 2013 comparison of 15 antipsychotics in schizophrenia, haloperidol demonstrated standard effectiveness. It was 13–16% more effective than ziprasidone, chlorpromazine, and asenapine, approximately as effective as quetiapine and aripiprazole, and 10% less effective than paliperidone. A 2013 systematic review compared haloperidol to placebo in schizophrenia:

Pregnancy and lactation 

Data from animal experiments indicate haloperidol is not teratogenic, but is embryotoxic in high doses.  In humans, no controlled studies exist.  Reports in pregnant women revealed possible damage to the fetus, although most of the women were exposed to multiple drugs during pregnancy. In addition,  reports indicate neonates exposed to antipsychotic drugs are at risk for extrapyramidal and/or withdrawal symptoms following delivery, such as agitation, hypertonia, hypotonia, tremor, somnolence, respiratory distress, and feeding disorder. Following accepted general principles, haloperidol should be given during pregnancy only if the benefit to the mother clearly outweighs the potential fetal risk.

Haloperidol is excreted in breast milk. A few studies have examined the impact of haloperidol exposure on breastfed infants and in most cases, there were no adverse effects on infant growth and development.

Other considerations 

During long-term treatment of chronic psychiatric disorders, the daily dose should be reduced to the lowest level needed for maintenance of remission.  Sometimes, it may be indicated to terminate haloperidol treatment gradually. In addition, during long-term use, routine monitoring including measurement of BMI, blood pressure, fasting blood sugar, and lipids, is recommended due to the risk of side effects.

Other forms of therapy (psychotherapy, occupational therapy/ergotherapy, or social rehabilitation) should be instituted properly.
PET imaging studies have suggested low doses are preferable. Clinical response was associated with at least 65% occupancy of D2 receptors, while greater than 72% was likely to cause hyperprolactinaemia and over 78% associated with extrapyramidal side effects. Doses of haloperidol greater than 5 mg increased the risk of side effects without improving efficacy. Patients responded with doses under even 2 mg in first-episode psychosis. For maintenance treatment of schizophrenia, an international consensus conference recommended a reduction dosage by about 20% every 6 months until a minimal maintenance dose is established.
 Depot forms are also available; these are injected deeply intramuscularly at regular intervals. The depot forms are not suitable for initial treatment, but are suitable for patients who have demonstrated inconsistency with oral dosages.

The decanoate ester of haloperidol (haloperidol decanoate, trade names Haldol decanoate, Halomonth, Neoperidole) has a much longer duration of action, so is often used in people known to be noncompliant with oral medication. A dose is given by intramuscular injection once every two to four weeks. The IUPAC name of haloperidol decanoate is [4-(4-chlorophenyl)-1-[4-(4-fluorophenyl)-4-oxobutyl]piperidin-4-yl] decanoate.

Topical formulations of haloperidol should not be used as treatment for nausea because research does not indicate this therapy is more effective than alternatives.

Adverse effects 

Sources for the following lists of adverse effects:

As haloperidol is a high-potency typical antipsychotic, it tends to produce significant extrapyramidal side effects. According to a 2013 meta-analysis of the comparative efficacy and tolerability of 15 antipsychotic drugs it was the most prone of the 15 for causing extrapyramidal side effects.

With more than 6 months of use 14 percent of users gain weight. Haloperidol may be neurotoxic.

Common (>1% incidence)
 Extrapyramidal side effects including:
 Akathisia (motor restlessness)
 Dystonia (continuous spasms and muscle contractions)
 Muscle rigidity
 Parkinsonism (characteristic symptoms such as rigidity)
 Hypotension
 Anticholinergic side effects such as: (These adverse effects are less common than with lower-potency typical antipsychotics, such as chlorpromazine and thioridazine.)
 Blurred vision
 Constipation
 Dry mouth
 Somnolence (which is not a particularly prominent side effect, as is supported by the results of the aforementioned meta-analysis.)

Unknown frequency
 Anemia
 Headache
 Increased respiratory rate
 Orthostatic hypotension
 Prolonged QT interval
 Visual disturbances

Rare (<1% incidence)

 Acute hepatic failure
 Agitation
 Agranulocytosis
 Anaphylactic reaction
 Anorexia
 Bronchospasm
 Cataracts
 Cholestasis
 Confusional state
 Depression
 Dermatitis exfoliative
 Dyspnea
 Edema
 Extrasystoles
 Face edema
 Gynecomastia
 Hepatitis
 Hyperglycemia
 Hypersensitivity
 Hyperthermia
 Hypoglycemia
 Hyponatremia
 Hypothermia
 Increased sweating
 Injection site abscess
 Insomnia
 Itchiness
 Jaundice
 Laryngeal edema
 Laryngospasm
 Leukocytoclastic vasculitis
 Leukopenia
 Liver function test abnormal
 Nausea
 Neuroleptic malignant syndrome
 Neutropenia
 Pancytopenia
 Photosensitivity reaction
 Priapism
 Psychotic disorder
 Pulmonary embolism
 Rash
 Retinopathy
 Seizure
 Sudden death
 Tardive dyskinesia
 Thrombocytopenia
 Torsades de pointes
 Urinary retention
 Urticaria
 Ventricular fibrillation
 Ventricular tachycardia
 Vomiting

Contraindications 

 Pre-existing coma, acute stroke
 Severe intoxication with alcohol or other central depressant drugs
 Known allergy against haloperidol or other butyrophenones or other drug ingredients
 Known heart disease, when combined will tend towards cardiac arrest

Special cautions 

 A multiple-year study suggested this drug and other neuroleptic antipsychotic drugs commonly given to people with Alzheimer's with mild behavioral problems often make their condition worse and its withdrawal was even beneficial for some cognitive and functional measures.
 Elderly patients with dementia-related psychosis: analysis of 17 trials showed the risk of death in this group of patients was 1.6 to 1.7 times that of placebo-treated patients. Most of the causes of death were either cardiovascular or infectious in nature. It is not clear to what extent this observation is attributed to antipsychotic drugs rather than the characteristics of the patients. The drug bears a boxed warning about this risk.
 Impaired liver function, as haloperidol is metabolized and eliminated mainly by the liver
 In patients with hyperthyroidism, the action of haloperidol is intensified and side effects are more likely.
 IV injections: risk of hypotension or orthostatic collapse
 Patients at special risk for the development of QT prolongation (hypokalemia, concomitant use of other drugs causing QT prolongation)
 Patients with a history of leukopenia: a complete blood count should be monitored frequently during the first few months of therapy and discontinuation of the drug should be considered at the first sign of a clinically significant decline in white blood cells.
 Pre-existing Parkinson's disease or dementia with Lewy bodies

Interactions 

 Amiodarone: Q-Tc interval prolongation (potentially dangerous change in heart rhythm).
 Amphetamine and methylphenidate: counteracts increased action of norepinephrine and dopamine in patients with narcolepsy or ADD/ADHD
 Epinephrine:  action antagonized, paradoxical decrease in blood pressure may result
 Guanethidine:  antihypertensive action antagonized
 Levodopa:  decreased action of levodopa
 Lithium:  rare cases of the following symptoms have been noted: encephalopathy, early and late extrapyramidal side effects, other neurologic symptoms, and coma.
 Methyldopa:  increased risk of extrapyramidal side effects and other unwanted central effects
 Other central depressants (alcohol, tranquilizers, narcotics):  actions and side effects of these drugs (sedation, respiratory depression) are increased. In particular, the doses of concomitantly used opioids for chronic pain can be reduced by 50%.
 Other drugs metabolized by the CYP3A4 enzyme system: inducers such as carbamazepine, phenobarbital, and rifampicin decrease plasma levels and inhibitors such as quinidine, buspirone, and fluoxetine increase plasma levels
 Tricyclic antidepressants:  metabolism and elimination of tricyclics significantly decreased, increased toxicity noted (anticholinergic and cardiovascular side effects, lowering of seizure threshold)

Discontinuation
The British National Formulary recommends a gradual withdrawal when discontinuing antipsychotics to avoid acute withdrawal syndrome or rapid relapse. Symptoms of withdrawal commonly include nausea, vomiting, and loss of appetite. Other symptoms may include restlessness, increased sweating, and trouble sleeping. Less commonly there may be a feeling of the world spinning, numbness, or muscle pains. Symptoms generally resolve after a short period of time.

There is tentative evidence that discontinuation of antipsychotics can result in psychosis. It may also result in reoccurrence of the condition that is being treated. Rarely tardive dyskinesia can occur when the medication is stopped.

Overdose

Symptoms 

Symptoms are usually due to side effects. Most often encountered are:

 Anticholinergic side effects (dry mouth, constipation, paralytic ileus, difficulties in urinating, decreased perspiration)
 Coma in severe cases, accompanied by respiratory depression and massive hypotension, shock
 Hypotension or hypertension
 Rarely, serious ventricular arrhythmia (torsades de pointes), with or without prolonged QT-time
 Sedation
 Severe extrapyramidal side effects with muscle rigidity and tremors, akathisia, etc.

Treatment 

Treatment is mostly symptomatic and involves intensive care with stabilization of vital functions. In early detected cases of oral overdose, induction of emesis, gastric lavage, and the use of activated charcoal can be tried. In the case of a severe overdose, antidotes such as bromocriptine or ropinirole may be used to treat the extrapyramidal effects caused by haloperidol, acting as dopamine receptor agonists. ECG and vital signs should be monitored especially for QT prolongation and severe arrhythmias should be treated with antiarrhythmic measures.

Prognosis 

An overdose of haloperidol can be fatal, but in general the prognosis after overdose is good, provided the person has survived the initial phase.

Pharmacology 

Haloperidol is a typical butyrophenone-type antipsychotic that exhibits high-affinity dopamine D2 receptor antagonism and slow receptor dissociation kinetics. It has effects similar to the phenothiazines. The drug binds preferentially to D2 and α1 receptors at low dose (ED50 = 0.13 and 0.42 mg/kg, respectively), and 5-HT2 receptors at a higher dose (ED50 = 2.6 mg/kg). Given that antagonism of D2 receptors is more beneficial on the positive symptoms of schizophrenia and antagonism of 5-HT2 receptors on the negative symptoms, this characteristic underlies haloperidol's greater effect on delusions, hallucinations and other manifestations of psychosis. Haloperidol's negligible affinity for histamine H1 receptors and muscarinic M1 acetylcholine receptors yields an antipsychotic with a lower incidence of sedation, weight gain, and orthostatic hypotension though having higher rates of treatment emergent extrapyramidal symptoms.

Haloperidol acts on these receptors: (Ki)
 D1 (silent antagonist) – Unknown efficiency 
 D5 (silent antagonist) – Unknown efficiency
 D2 (inverse agonist) – 0.7 nM
 D3 (inverse agonist) – 0.2 nM
 D4 (inverse agonist) – 5–9 nM
 σ1 (irreversible inactivation by haloperidol metabolite HPP+) –  3 nM
 σ2 (agonist): 54 nM
 5HT1A receptor agonist –  1927 nM
 5HT2A (silent antagonist) –  53 nM
 5HT2C (silent antagonist) – 10,000 nM
 5HT6 (silent antagonist) – 3666 nM
 5HT7 (irreversible silent antagonist) – 377.2 nM
 H1 (silent antagonist) – 1,800 nM
 M1 (silent antagonist) – 10,000 nM
 α1A (silent antagonist) – 12 nM
 α2A (silent antagonist) – 1130 nM
 α2B (silent antagonist) – 480 nM
 α2C (silent antagonist) – 550 nM
 NR1/NR2B subunit containing NMDA receptor (antagonist; ifenprodil site): IC50 – 2,000 nM

Pharmacokinetics

By mouth 

The bioavailability of oral haloperidol ranges from 60 to 70%. However, there is a wide variance in reported mean Tmax and T1/2 in different studies, ranging from 1.7 to 6.1 hours and 14.5 to 36.7 hours respectively.

Intramuscular injections 

The drug is well and rapidly absorbed with a high bioavailability when injected intramuscularly. The Tmax is 20 minutes in healthy individuals and 33.8 minutes in patients with schizophrenia. The mean T1/2 is 20.7 hours. The decanoate injectable formulation is for intramuscular administration only and is not intended to be used intravenously. The plasma concentrations of haloperidol decanoate reach a peak at about six days after the injection, falling thereafter, with an approximate half-life of three weeks.

Intravenous injections 

The bioavailability is 100% in intravenous (IV) injection, and the very rapid onset of action is seen within seconds. The T1/2 is 14.1 to 26.2 hours. The apparent volume of distribution is between 9.5 and 21.7 L/kg.  The duration of action is four to six hours.

Therapeutic concentrations 

Plasma levels of five to 15 micrograms per liter are typically seen for therapeutic response (Ulrich S, et al. Clin Pharmacokinet. 1998). The determination of plasma levels is rarely used to calculate dose adjustments but can be useful to check compliance.

The concentration of haloperidol in brain tissue is about 20-fold higher compared to blood levels. It is slowly eliminated from brain tissue,  which may explain the slow disappearance of side effects when the medication is stopped.

Distribution and metabolism 

Haloperidol is heavily protein bound in human plasma, with a free fraction of only 7.5 to 11.6%. It is also extensively metabolized in the liver with only about 1% of the administered dose excreted unchanged in the urine. The greatest proportion of the hepatic clearance is by glucuronidation, followed by reduction and CYP-mediated oxidation, primarily by CYP3A4.

History 

Haloperidol was discovered by Paul Janssen. It was developed in 1958 at the Belgian company Janssen Pharmaceutica and submitted to the first of clinical trials in Belgium later that year.

Haloperidol was approved by the U.S. Food and Drug Administration (FDA) on 12 April 1967; it was later marketed in the U.S. and other countries under the brand name Haldol by McNeil Laboratories.

Society and culture

Cost
Haloperidol is relatively inexpensive, being up to 100 fold less expensive than newer antipsychotics.

Brand names 

Haloperidol is the INN, BAN, USAN, AAN approved name.

It is sold under the tradenames Aloperidin, Bioperidolo, Brotopon, Dozic, Duraperidol (Germany), Einalon S, Eukystol, Haldol (common tradename in the US and UK), Halol, Halosten, Keselan, Linton, Peluces, Serenace and Sigaperidol.

Veterinary use 

Haloperidol is also used on many different kinds of animals for nonselective tranquilization and diminishing behavioral arousal, in veterinary and other settings including captivity management.

References

External links 
 

4-Phenylpiperidines
Antiemetics
Belgian inventions
Butyrophenone antipsychotics
Chemical substances for emergency medicine
Chloroarenes
CYP2D6 inducers
CYP2D6 inhibitors
Fluoroarenes
Johnson & Johnson brands
Janssen Pharmaceutica
NMDA receptor antagonists
Prolactin releasers
Suspected embryotoxicants
Suspected fetotoxicants
Tertiary alcohols
Typical antipsychotics
World Health Organization essential medicines
Wikipedia medicine articles ready to translate